The 1976–77 Divizia A was the fifty-ninth season of Divizia A, the top-level football league of Romania.

Teams

League table

Results

Top goalscorers

Champion squad

See also 

 1976–77 Divizia B
 1976–77 Divizia C
 1976–77 County Championship

References

Liga I seasons
Romania
1976–77 in Romanian football